E89 may refer to:
BMW Z4 (E89)
European route E89
King's Indian Defense, Encyclopedia of Chess Openings code
Second Keihan Highway, route E89 in Japan